Indian Institutes of Information Technology (IIITs) are a group of 25 interdisciplinary technology-based-engineering research institutions in India which are focused on information technology. Five of them are established, funded and managed by the Ministry of Education (MOE). The other 20 are set up on the public-private partnership (PPP) model, funded by the central government, state governments and industry partners in the ratio 50:35:15.

Formation
Prior to 2014, the IIITs at Gwalior, Allahabad, Jabalpur, and Kancheepuram were set up by the Ministry of Human Resource Development (MHRD). 

In 2014, The Indian Institutes of Information Technology Bill, 2014 was introduced in the Lok Sabha. The bill sought to grant the status of Institutes of National Importance (INI) upon the four IIITs. After much debate and changes, the bill was passed by the Parliament on 1 December 2014 and published as Indian Institutes of Information Technology Act, 2014 on 8 December 2014, coming into effect on 5 January 2015.

In 2015, a fifth institute was set up by the MHRD in Kurnool, as part as the government obligation under the Andhra Pradesh Reorganisation Act, 2014. Indian Institutes of Information Technology (Amendment) Act, 2017 granted the INI status to the Kurnool institute.

Besides the above fully government funded IIITs, in 2010 the Union Cabinet approved a scheme for setting up twenty more IIITs, based on the public-private partnership (PPP) model, funded by the central government, state governments and industry partners in the ratio 50:35:15. As of 2014, 23 proposals were made by 21 states (Andhra Pradesh (Chittoor & Kakinada), Assam, Bihar, Chhattisgarh, Goa, Gujarat, Haryana, Himachal Pradesh, Jharkhand, Karnataka, Kerala, Madhya Pradesh, Maharashtra (Pune & Nagpur), Manipur, Odisha, Punjab, Rajasthan, Tamil Nadu, Tripura, West Bengal, and Uttar Pradesh), and 16 proposals were approved (Andhra Pradesh (Chittoor&Kakinada), Assam, Gujarat, Haryana, Himachal Pradesh, Karnataka, Kerala, Madhya Pradesh, Rajasthan, Tamil Nadu, Maharashtra (Pune), Uttar Pradesh, West Bengal, Manipur, and Tripura). , 14 of these IIITs were set up, the ones not being set up are the ones in Kakinada, Andhra Pradesh and in Agartala, Tripura. In addition, in 2015 the MHRD approved a IIIT in Nagpur, Maharashtra and in Ranchi, Jharkhand. A IIIT in Bhagalpur, Bihar was approved in 2016. Finally, to close the list of 20 'approved' IIITs, a IIIT in Surat, Gujarat was approved and set up in 2017. , these four newer institutes were already established, leaving only the institutes in Kakinada and Agartala to be established.

On 9 August 2017, The Indian Institutes of Information Technology (Public-Private Partnership) Act, 2017 has been notified in the Gazette of India. The act confers the INI status on 15 IIITs set up on the public-private partnership (PPP) mode in Vadodara, Guwahati, Sri City, Kota, Tiruchirappalli, Kalyani, Una, Sonepat, Lucknow, Kottayam, Manipur, Dharwad, Pune, Nagpur, and Ranchi.

Three of the IIITs set up under the PPP model in 2017, namely institutes in Surat, Bhopal, and Bhagalpur, were not mentioned in the 2017 PPP act, nor were the institutes in Kakinada and Agartala.

In 2018, the Government of Tripura approved  for the establishment of IIIT Agartala, which was stalled since 2012, covering  which were missing from private sources under the PPP model. The institution was set to start classes in the 2018–2019 academic session from the NIT Agartala campus.

In 2016, the central government gave in-principle approval for an IIIT in Raichur, Karnataka. In 2018, the MHRD clarified that the Raichur institute will officially replace the Kakinada one, and asked the state government to assign land for the institute, planning to make the institute functional by the following year. However, since the land was not acquired, in 2019 the MHRD decided to shift the IIIT to Hyderabad, Telangana. IIIT Raichur started its academic activity in August 2019 from the temporary campus of Indian Institute of Technology Hyderabad, Telangana.

In 2020, the Indian Institutes of Information Technology Laws (Amendment) Bill, 2020 was introduced, officially declaring the IIITs in Surat, Bhopal, Bhagalpur, Agartala, and Raichur as well as conferring the INI status on them. The bill was passed by the Lok Sabha on 20 March 2020 and by the Rajya Sabha on 22 September 2020.

Admission
Admissions into undergraduate programmes in IIITs for about 7,000 seats are through the Joint Seat Allocation Authority and JEE-Main. For postgraduate programs admission is through Graduate Aptitude Test in Engineering (GATE).

List of IIITs 
The Indian Institutes of Information Technology are located in:

References 

 
1997 establishments in India
Educational institutions established in 1997